Serbin is a Slavic masculine surname. Its feminine counterpart is Serbina. It may refer to:
Mykhailo Serbin (born 2003), Ukrainian Paralympic swimmer
Nina Serbina (born 1951), Ukrainian high jumper
Oleg Serbin (born 1982), Ukrainian librarian
Svitlana Serbina (born 1980), Ukrainian diver

See also

References